Moclinejo is a town and municipality in the province of Málaga, part of the autonomous community of Andalusia in southern Spain. It belongs to the comarca of La Axarquía. The municipality is situated approximately 17 kilometres from Málaga and 558 km from Madrid. It has a population of approximately 1200 residents. The natives are called Moclinejenses or Conejos as a nickname.

References

Municipalities in the Province of Málaga